Seokchon Gobun Station is a railway station on Seoul Subway Line 9. It opened on December 1, 2018.

References

Seoul Metropolitan Subway stations
Metro stations in Songpa District
Railway stations opened in 2018